Piazza Armerina (Gallo-Italic of Sicily: Ciazza; Sicilian: Chiazza) is a comune in the province of Enna of the autonomous island region of Sicily, southern Italy.

History

The city of Piazza (as it was called before 1862) developed during the Norman domination in Sicily (11th century), when Lombards settled the central and eastern part of Sicily.

But the area had been inhabited since prehistoric times.  The city flourished during Roman times, as shown by the large mosaics at the patrician Villa Romana del Casale.

Remains, artifacts of old settlements and a necropolis from the 8th century BC were found in the territory of the comune.

Boris Giuliano (1930-1979) was born in Piazza Armerina.

Main sights

It also has a range of significant architecture dating from medieval through the 18th century. The medieval history of the city is manifest in some of its houses, which show Norman or Gothic architecture.  The main landmarks include a range of architectural styles:

Piazza Armerina Cathedral: church was built atop the 15th-century foundations of a former church, from which the bell tower was taken and reused; completed during 17th and 18th centuries.  Also original to the 15th-century church are the Catalan-Gothic style windows on the left side.  The dome dates from 1768.  The façade has a notable portal with spiral columns by Leonardo De Luca.  The interior, with a single large nave, houses the Madonna della Vittoria (Madonna of the Victory).  The Byzantine icon is traditionally associated with the banner donated by the Pope to Roger I of Sicily during the Council of Melfi.  The cathedral has an unusual two-sided crucifix by an unknown artist.  The Diocesan Museum holds reliquaries, articles of silverware, monstrances and other religious art works.
Palazzo Trigona: palace of the wealthy family who commissioned the nearby cathedrachurch.
San Rocco: church of Fundrò with a carved tufa portal.
Palazzo di Città (1613), characterized by a fresco ceiling by Salvatore Martorana.
Aragonese Castle (1392–96).  It is square in shape, with square towers.
San Giovanni Evangelista: 14th-century church with interior frescoes by Guglielmo Borremans and assistants.
Sant'Anna: 18th century church with Baroque sinuous façade inspired by the buildings of Borromini.
The church of St. Martin of Tours: church completed in 1163.
Santa Maria di Gesù: 16th century church now abandoned.
Garibaldi Theatre.

Outside the city is the ancient church of the Priorato di Sant'Andrea (1096), founded by Count Simon of Butera, a nephew of Roger I of Sicily.  It has important medieval frescoes.

Culture
Piazza Armerina holds an annual Palio dei Normanni, a re-enactment in costume of the entrance of the Norman Count Roger I to the city.  It takes place on 12–14 August.

Language

Piazza Armerina is one of the so-called "Lombard" communes of Sicily, as its dialect differs notably from that of the neighbouring region. This is due to the destruction of the old Piazza by king William I of Sicily, and the subsequent repopulation by William II (according to other scholars, during the slightly later age of Frederick II) with colonists coming from northern Italy (then collectively called  "Lombardy"), especially from Monferrato and Piacenza.

References

Sources

External links 

 
Villa Romana del Casale website  
Piazza Armerina, city of Mosaics

Municipalities of the Province of Enna
Populated places established in the 11th century
11th-century establishments in Italy
Roman sites of Sicily